The Palm Springs School of Architecture, often called Desert Modernism, is a regional style of post-war architecture that emerged in Palm Springs, California. Many of the architects who pioneered this style became world-renowned later in their own careers. Numerous buildings and homes by these architects remain in the Coachella Valley. Additionally, this style of architecture is showcased annually at the Modernism Week event in Palm Springs.

Characteristics
The Palm Springs School of Architecture is characterized by its adaptation to the desert's brutal climate. Block walls, clerestory windows, long, low rooflines and the inclusion of the desert itself in the design highlight the common elements of the Palm Springs School. Architectural movements are often recognized only after the fact.  While the spectrum of Palm Springs' midcentury architecture stretches all the way from John Lautner to Richard Neutra, the many architects working in this small town responded to a unique combination of conditions through a shared commitment to Modernism. This supported creative, experimental approaches, and took advantage of the freedom that the California environment offered.

Each architect responded to the desert climate and sunlight, the mountain landscape, the recreational culture, willing and well-heeled clients, and a commitment to Modern techniques from mass production to steel and concrete construction. Their responses were different, but their devotion to modern ideas in the open atmosphere of Palm Springs and California nurtured a remarkable concentration of ideas and buildings. Though they are related to the general wave in innovative design in midcentury California, the relative isolation of this small town, the focus on a few issues, and the large percentage of contributing architects who worked almost exclusively in Palm Springs lead to an identifiable approach to architecture that may be called the Palm Springs School.

Notable architects
Robson C. Chambers, John Porter Clark, William F. Cody, Albert Frey, A. Quincy Jones, Hugh M. Kaptur, William Krisel, John Lautner, Richard Neutra, Donald Wexler, E. Stewart Williams, and Paul Revere Williams are the leading names of this regional style.

Other architects contributing to the Palm Springs School of Architecture include Barry Berkus, Herbert Burns, Charles DuBois, Edward Fickett, Rick Harrison, Howard Lapham, Harold Levitt, James McNaughton, Val Powelson, Robert Ricciardi, Stan Sackly, and Laszlo Sandor.

Donald Wexler's Steel House #2 is listed on the National Register of Historic Places.

Architect and historian Alan Hess is a leading advocate of the Palm Springs School of Architecture.

References

American architectural styles
Modernist architecture in California